4th & Wall is the second studio album by the dream pop band West Indian Girl, released in October 2007 on Milan Records.

The album takes its name from the street corner in Los Angeles where the band's studio is located.

The first single from the album was "Blue Wave", which was released in advance of the album.

Production
Prior to this release, West Indian Girl had been a duo, consisting of Robert James and Francis Ten. For this album, four new members were added to the band's lineup - Mariqueen Maandig on vocals, Mark Lewis on drums and Nathan Van Hala and Amy White on keyboards.

Track listing

Personnel
Robert James – vocals, guitar
Francis Ten – bass
Mariqueen Maandig – vocals, tambourine
Mark Lewis – drums, backing vocals
Nathan Van Hala – keyboards
Amy White – keyboards, backing vocals
Chris Arpad - guest Steel Pans

References

External links
Official band website
Band MySpace site

West Indian Girl on recording 4th & Wall in Remix Mag, December 2007

2007 albums
West Indian Girl albums